Peter Engelmann (January 24, 1823May 17, 1874) was a German American immigrant, educationist, writer, and Wisconsin pioneer.  He was the founder of the collection which became the Milwaukee Public Museum, and was also founder of the influential "German-English Academy" of Milwaukee, Wisconsin, which lives on as part of the University School of Milwaukee.

Early life and flight from Germany
Peter Engelmann was born on January 24, 1823, in Argenthal, in the Rhine Province of the Kingdom of Prussia.  He studied at the University of Heidelberg and at the Humboldt University of Berlin.  He received his teaching license in 1846, and began teaching at the Kreuznach Gymnasium that year.

At Bad Kreuznach, he became affiliated with the republican movement and founded the Kreuznacher Gymnastics and Civic Association, which led to his dismissal from teaching.  He then became a writer and editor of a Prussian revolutionary newspaper, the Freier Demokrat (Free Democrat), in the midst of the German revolutions of 1848–1849.

After Prussia and the various German states crushed the effort to create a German Republic, Engelmann was threatened with jail for his revolutionary activities and decided to flee Germany.  He emigrated to the United States—like many other German Forty-Eighters.  He initially came to Marshall, Michigan, where he worked on a farm, but then made his way to Oshkosh, Wisconsin, and finally to Milwaukee.

German-American Academy
In Milwaukee, he was quickly employed as a teacher for German American students, and he became deeply involved with the Milwaukee Schulverein—"school society".  Through his efforts, they established the German-English Academy—with a charter from the Wisconsin Legislature—in May 1851.  Engelmann served as director of the academy for the rest of his life.  The school was so closely associated with him, it was often referred to alternatively as the "Engelmann School".

The school gave instruction partly in English and partly in German, and pursued a well-rounded education including classes such as singing, gymnastics, and drawing.  The school attempted to help students learn how to think for themselves, challenging students to observe and question. In 1873, Engelmann also established a kindergarten in his academy.  This was the first kindergarten in Milwaukee and only the third in the country.

The school continued after his death.  It later came to be known as the "Milwaukee University School" and, in 1864, it merged with other Milwaukee private schools to form the University School of Milwaukee.

Milwaukee Public Museum
In 1857, Engelmann was also one of the founders of the Wisconsin Natural History Society ("Naturhistorichen Verein von Wisconsin").  The society accumulated a collection of specimens and manuscripts, referred to as the "Engelmann Museum".  In 1882, the collection was turned over to the city of Milwaukee, which continued the exhibit as the Milwaukee Public Museum.

Personal life and legacy
Engelmann married Jane Young in Michigan shortly after his arrival in America in 1849, but she died in 1856.  They had no children.

He was also active in several organizations of freethinkers, wrote numerous articles, and lectured before liberal and scientific societies.

He died at his home in Milwaukee on the night of May 17, 1874, after a bout of Pneumonia.

References 

American educational theorists
Educators from Wisconsin
Heidelberg University alumni
German emigrants to the United States
People from the Rhine Province
People from Marshall, Michigan
People from Oshkosh, Wisconsin
Writers from Milwaukee
1823 births
1874 deaths
German-American Forty-Eighters
19th-century American educators